Joseph Wyatt may refer to:

 Joseph Wyatt (theatre owner) (1788–1860), Australian theatre owner
 Joseph P. Wyatt Jr. (born 1941), member of the U.S. House of Representatives